Peter Doell is an American recording and mastering engineer known for his work with Miles Davis, Toto, Céline Dion and The Beach Boys. Doell has been a staff engineer at Capitol Studios, Sunset Sound Recorders and Universal Mastering Studios West. His film and TV work includes Road To Perdition, Black Hawk Down and Monsters, Inc., American Idol, The Voice and Empire.

Doell is a member of the executive committee of the Audio Engineering Society Los Angeles Section, the National Academy of Recording Arts and Sciences Producers and Engineers Wing and past member of the AES Mastering Panel.

Early life and education 
Doell grew up in Rochester, New York. His interest in music was sparked by the summer concert series "The Arrangers Holiday" at the Eastman School of Music, where Phil Ramone was the recording engineer. During high school, Doell played the electric bass on bands he put together.

Doell started college enrolled in a biology program to later pursue a career in medicine. He changed from biology to music after seeing the multi-track tape recorders at his college's music department. Doell graduated from University at Albany with a B.A. in Electronic Music Composition.

Career

Recording engineer 
Doell began his career as a recording engineer at Dimension Sound in Boston in 1974. In 1980, he relocated to Los Angeles as a recording engineer at Wally Heider Studios. He was assistant engineer on Eddie Money's album “No Control” produced by Tom Dowd

After a year at Wally Heider, Doell moved to Sunset Sound Factory, where he was a technician for 18 months. In 1983 Doell moved to Capitol Studios, where he worked for 15 years. Peter Doell was the recording engineer for the albums “While the City Sleeps...” by George Benson and “Tutu” by Miles Davis, produced by Tommy LiPuma. He was recommended to LiPuma by James Newton Howard. Davis won the Grammy Award for "Best Jazz Instrumental Performance, Soloist" for his performance on "Tutu".

Throughout the late 80s and 90s, Doell was recording engineer on albums including “Festival” by Lee Ritenour (1988), “Standard Time, Vol. 3: The Resolution of Romance” by Wynton Marsalis (1990), “The Sun Don't Lie” by Marcus Miller (1993), “Duets” and “Duets II” by Frank Sinatra (1993 and 1994), “Falling into You” by Céline Dion (1996) and the original motion picture soundtrack for “Tarzan” by Phil Collins and Mark Mancina (1999).

Mastering engineer 
In the early 2000s, Doell took on a role as mastering engineer. He worked as senior mastering engineer at Universal Mastering Studios West's Studio A. This room was known for its unusually large dimensions for a mastering studio (32’x21’x11’). Doell mastered records from labels affiliated to Capitol Music Group, owned by Universal Music Group (UMG), as well as from independent clients. At Universal, Doell mastered the album "Toto XIV", which won a TEC Award in 2016 in the "Record Production/Album" category.

In February 2016, Doell joined AfterMaster Audio Labs as senior mastering engineer as the company expanded its mastering services.

In September 2022, Doell founded the mastering studio 21st Century Audio. Albums mastered by Doell at 21st Century Audio include "Fifty" by The Manhattan Transfer , "Live in Italy" by the Peter Erskine Trio and "Vulnerable" by Nikkole.

Audio Lunch 
Doell organizes a weekly lunchtime gathering in Burbank, California. Producers and engineers meet on the outdoor patio of a Mexican restaurant. Attendance has reached 150.

Accolades

Grammy Awards 
Doell is credited as mastering engineer on the following Grammy-nominated albums at the 65th Annual Grammy Awards:

 Fifty – The Manhattan Transfer (Best Jazz Vocal Album) 
 Live in Italy – Peter Erskine Trio (Best Jazz Instrumental Album)

RIAA 
Doell is credited as engineer in the following RIAA certified records:

 A New Day Has Come, Céline Dion (3× Platinum)
 Christmas Memories, Barbra Streisand (Platinum)
 This Time, Dwight Yoakam (3× Platinum)
 If There Was A Way, Dwight Yoakam (Platinum)
 Reckoning, R.E.M. (Gold)

Goldmine Magazine 
Doell is credited as mastering engineer on Nikkole's 2021 album "Vulnerable", chosen #1 on Goldmine Magazine's 2022 Top 10 Soul and R&B albums of the year.

Selected discography

References

External links 

 Art of Rock with Kosh & Friends 10: Peter Doell
 Bobby Owsinski's Inner Circle Ep. 64: Gaming Spotify, UPSs, and Mastering Engineer Pete Doell
 Bobby Owsinski's Inner Circle Ep. 165: Mastering Engineer Pete Doell, The Principles Of The New Music Business, And Apple's New Hardware
 Working Class Audio Ep. 51: Peter Doell
 Universal Audio: Mastering with the masters
 First time mastering your music? 17 tips from industry pros
 Pete Doell Talks about Universal Mastering Studio A

Living people
Mastering engineers
American audio engineers
Year of birth missing (living people)
Engineers from New York (state)